Henry Bernard Chalon (1770–1849) was an English painter and lithographer.

Life 
Son of the Dutch émigré and engraver Jan Chalon (1749–95), Henry studied at the Royal Academy Schools and then started specializing in sporting and animal painting.  He was appointed Animal Painter to Frederica, Duchess of York, in 1795, and later to both the Prince Regent and King William IV.  Royal patronage also led to work for many other social prominent sporting enthusiasts but, despite exhibiting frequently at the Royal Academy, he never became a member of it.  This may be because of a conservative trend in painting at this time, which favoured George Stubbs's measured style, which Chalon forever tried to imitate.  He also drew lithographs for Philipp Andre's "Specimens of Polyautography" in 1804.

His one child, a daughter, was the miniaturist Maria A Chalon (Mrs Henry Moseley, c. 1800–67).

External links 

 HB Chalon on Artcyclopaedia
 HB Chalon at Tate Britain
 John Noott Galleries - biography

1770 births
1849 deaths
18th-century English painters
English male painters
19th-century English painters
English lithographers
19th-century English male artists
18th-century English male artists